Lipid A deacylase (PagL)  is an outer membrane protein with lipid A 3-O-deacylase activity.  It forms an 8 stranded beta barrel structure.

References 

  
Protein domains
Protein families
Outer membrane proteins